Adaina desolata is a moth of the family Pterophoridae. It is found in Colombia.

The forewings are pale brown. Adults are on wing in August, at an altitude of 2,750 meters.

References

Moths described in 1995
Oidaematophorini